Sigríður Ingibjörg Ingadóttir (born 29 May 1968) is an Icelandic economist and politician. She is a former member of parliament of the Althing and a former member of the board of the National Bank of Iceland. She represents the Social Democratic Alliance and is a previous member of the Women's List, which merged into SDA in 2000. She challenged party chairman Árni Páll Árnason for the leadership at SDAs annual conference in 2015, but lost by a single vote.

External links
Althing biography

Living people
1968 births
Sigridur Ingibjorg Ingadottir
Sigridur Ingibjorg Ingadottir
Sigridur Ingibjorg Ingadottir